Guy Sabrou (2 July 1908 – 18 December 1993) was a French architect. His work was part of the architecture event in the art competition at the 1948 Summer Olympics.

References

1908 births
1993 deaths
20th-century French architects
Olympic competitors in art competitions
People from Bergerac, Dordogne